Melavanjore is a sub-village of Vanjore village in the T.R.Pattinam taluk of Karaikal District. It is situated at a distance of about 10 kilometres south of Karaikal town and forms the southernmost settlement in Karaikal District.

References

Villages in Karaikal district